is a Japanese football player who plays for Verspah Oita.

Career
Raised by his home-town team Albirex Niigata, Watanabe was promoted to the top team in 2011. He never played, but he was loaned twice, before to Tokushima Vortis and then to Japan Soccer College. He was loaned again in August 2018 to Vonds Ichihara.

Club statistics
Updated to 31 December 2020.

Honours
 Blaublitz Akita
 J3 League (1): 2020

References

External links

Profile at J. League

Profile at Niigata
Profile at Akita

1992 births
Living people
Association football people from Niigata Prefecture
Japanese footballers
J1 League players
J2 League players
Albirex Niigata players
Tokushima Vortis players
Japan Soccer College players
Vonds Ichihara players
Blaublitz Akita players
Association football goalkeepers